The Day-Taylor House is a historic house at 81 Wethersfield Avenue in Hartford, Connecticut.  Built in 1857, it is one of state's best examples of Italianate villa architecture executed in brick.  It was listed on the National Register of Historic Places in 1975.  It presently houses offices.

Description and history
The Day-Taylor House is located in Hartford's Sheldon-Charter Oak neighborhood, on the west side of Wethersfield Avenue directly opposite the Armsmear estate house of Samuel Colt.  It is a -story masonry structure, built out of red brick in a roughly L-shaped plan.  It has a hip roof, and a three-story tower rising at the crook of the ell. Both the main roof and tower roof have extended eaves with evenly spaced heavy brackets.  Windows on the first two levels are generally set in pairs in rectangular openings with bracketed hoods, although some are set in round-arch openings.  Some windows have original cast iron balconies.  There are small windows of different shapes in the attic story, including a round-arch window set at the center of the main front-facing facade.  A single-story veranda, supported by Corinthian columns, is arrayed around the base of the tower.  The interior of the building retains little original styling.

The house was built in 1857 by Hirim Bushnell, the builder of the Connecticut State Capitol and the Memorial Arch in Bushnell Park.  It was built for Albert F. Day, a prominent local merchant whose father was Lieutenant Governor of Connecticut.  Although its architect is not known, the house bears some resemblance to works of New Haven architect Henry Austin, a champion of the Italianate villa form.

See also
National Register of Historic Places listings in Hartford, Connecticut

References

Houses on the National Register of Historic Places in Connecticut
Houses completed in 1857
Houses in Hartford, Connecticut
National Register of Historic Places in Hartford, Connecticut
1857 establishments in Connecticut
Historic district contributing properties in Connecticut